Boy Crazy is a 1922 American comedy film directed by William A. Seiter and written by Beatrice Van. The film stars Doris May, Fred Gamble, Jean Hathaway, Frank Kingsley, Harry Myers, and Otto Hoffman. The film was released on March 5, 1922, by the Robertson-Cole Distributing Corporation. With no copies listed as being held in any film archive, it is likely to be a lost film.

Plot
As described in a film magazine, vivacious Jackie Cameron (May) plays her Juliet to a half dozen Romeos. When the general store operated by her father (Gamble) is threatened with bankruptcy, she borrows $2,000 from Mr. Skinner (Hoffman), the town millionaire, and builds up a fine business by turning it into an up-to-date haberdashery. Across the street is a rival concern, a ladies' millin ery shop conducted by J. Smythe (Myers) from Paris. Kidnappers (Brady and Farley) plan to capture old Skinner's daughter Evelina (Short), and overhear her say that she is planning on buying a dress on display by Smythe. When Jackie buys the dress, they take her by mistake and she is locked in a deserted house and held for ransom. Smythe, who has fallen in love with Jackie, comes to her rescue, and she saves him from a severe beating by dropping jugs on the heads of the criminals.

Cast       
Doris May as Jackie Cameron
Fred Gamble as Mr. Cameron
Jean Hathaway as Mrs. Cameron
Frank Kingsley as Tom Winton
Harry Myers as J. Smythe
Otto Hoffman as Mr. Skinner
Gertrude Short as Evelina Skinner
Eugenia Tuttle as Mrs. Winton
Ed Brady as Kidnapper
James Farley as Kidnapper

References

External links

1922 films
1920s English-language films
Silent American comedy films
1922 comedy films
Film Booking Offices of America films
Films directed by William A. Seiter
American silent feature films
American black-and-white films
1920s American films